Margaret Mead (December 16, 1901 – November 15, 1978) was an American cultural anthropologist who featured frequently as an author and speaker in the mass media during the 1960s and the 1970s.

She earned her bachelor's degree at Barnard College of Columbia University and her M.A. and Ph.D. degrees from Columbia. Mead served as president of the American Association for the Advancement of Science in 1975.

Mead was a communicator of anthropology in modern American and Western culture and was often controversial as an academic. Her reports detailing the attitudes towards sex in South Pacific and Southeast Asian traditional cultures influenced the 1960s sexual revolution. She was a proponent of broadening sexual conventions within the context of Western cultural traditions.

Birth, early family life, and education
Margaret Mead, the first of five children, was born in Philadelphia but raised in nearby Doylestown, Pennsylvania. Her father, Edward Sherwood Mead, was a professor of finance at the Wharton School of the University of Pennsylvania, and her mother, Emily (née Fogg) Mead, was a sociologist who studied Italian immigrants. Her sister Katharine (1906–1907) died at the age of nine months. That was a traumatic event for Mead, who had named the girl, and thoughts of her lost sister permeated her daydreams for many years. Her family moved frequently and so her early education was directed by her grandmother until, at age 11, she was enrolled by her family at Buckingham Friends School in Lahaska, Pennsylvania. Her family owned the Longland farm from 1912 to 1926. Born into a family of various religious outlooks, she searched for a form of religion that gave an expression of the faith with which she had been formally acquainted, Christianity. In doing so, she found the rituals of the United States Episcopal Church to fit the expression of religion she was seeking. Mead studied one year, 1919, at DePauw University, then transferred to Barnard College.

Mead earned her bachelor's degree from Barnard in 1923, began studying with professors Franz Boas and Ruth Benedict at Columbia University, and earned her master's degree in 1924. Mead set out in 1925 to do fieldwork in Samoa. In 1926, she joined the American Museum of Natural History, New York City, as assistant curator. She received her Ph.D. from Columbia University in 1929.

Personal life
Before departing for Samoa, Mead had a short affair with the linguist Edward Sapir, a close friend of her instructor Ruth Benedict. However, Sapir's conservative stances about marriage and women's roles were unacceptable to Mead, and as Mead left to do field work in Samoa, they separated permanently. Mead received news of Sapir's remarriage while she was living in Samoa. There, on a beach, she later burned their correspondence.

Mead was married three times. After a six-year engagement, she married her first husband (1923–1928), Luther Cressman, an American theology student who later became an anthropologist. Between 1925 and 1926, she was in Samoa from where on the return boat she met Reo Fortune, a New Zealander headed to Cambridge, England, to study psychology. They were married in 1928, after Mead's divorce from Cressman. Mead dismissively characterized her union with her first husband as "my student marriage" in her 1972 autobiography Blackberry Winter, a sobriquet with which Cressman took vigorous issue. Mead's third and longest-lasting marriage (1936–1950) was to the British anthropologist Gregory Bateson with whom she had a daughter, Mary Catherine Bateson, who would also become an anthropologist.

Mead's pediatrician was Benjamin Spock, whose subsequent writings on child rearing incorporated some of Mead's own practices and beliefs acquired from her ethnological field observations which she shared with him; in particular, breastfeeding on the baby's demand, rather than by a schedule. She readily acknowledged that Gregory Bateson was the husband she loved the most. She was devastated when he left her and remained his loving friend ever afterward. She kept his photograph by her bedside wherever she traveled, including beside her hospital deathbed. 

Mead also had an exceptionally-close relationship with Ruth Benedict, one of her instructors. In her memoir about her parents, With a Daughter's Eye, Mary Catherine Bateson strongly implies that the relationship between Benedict and Mead was partly sexual. Mead never openly identified herself as lesbian or bisexual. In her writings, she proposed that it is to be expected that an individual's sexual orientation may evolve throughout life.

She spent her last years in a close personal and professional collaboration with the anthropologist Rhoda Metraux with whom she lived from 1955 until her death in 1978. Letters between the two published in 2006 with the permission of Mead's daughter clearly express a romantic relationship.

Mead had two sisters and a brother, Elizabeth, Priscilla, and Richard. Elizabeth Mead (1909–1983), an artist and teacher, married the cartoonist William Steig, and Priscilla Mead (1911–1959) married the author Leo Rosten. Mead's brother, Richard, was a professor. Mead was also the aunt of Jeremy Steig.

Career and later life

During World War II, Mead was executive secretary of the National Research Council's Committee on Food Habits.  She was curator of ethnology at the American Museum of Natural History from 1946 to 1969. She was elected a Fellow of the American Academy of Arts and Sciences in 1948, the United States National Academy of Sciences in 1975, and the American Philosophical Society in 1977. She taught at The New School and Columbia University, where she was an adjunct professor from 1954 to 1978 and a professor of anthropology and chair of the Division of Social Sciences at Fordham University's Lincoln Center campus from 1968 to 1970, founding their anthropology department. In 1970, she joined the faculty of the University of Rhode Island as a Distinguished Professor of Sociology and Anthropology.

Following Ruth Benedict's example, Mead focused her research on problems of child rearing, personality, and culture. She served as president of the Society for Applied Anthropology in 1950 and of the American Anthropological Association in 1960. In the mid-1960s, Mead joined forces with the communications theorist Rudolf Modley in jointly establishing an organization called Glyphs Inc., whose goal was to create a universal graphic symbol language to be understood by any members of culture, no matter how "primitive." In the 1960s, Mead served as the Vice President of the New York Academy of Sciences. She held various positions in the American Association for the Advancement of Science, notably president in 1975 and chair of the executive committee of the board of directors in 1976. She was a recognizable figure in academia and usually wore a distinctive cape and carried a walking stick.

Mead was a key participant in the Macy conferences on cybernetics and an editor of their proceedings. Mead's address to the inaugural conference of the American Society for Cybernetics was instrumental in the development of second-order cybernetics.

Mead was featured on two record albums published by Folkways Records. The first, released in 1959, An Interview With Margaret Mead, explored the topics of morals and anthropology.  In 1971, she was included in a compilation of talks by prominent women, But the Women Rose, Vol. 2: Voices of Women in American History.

She is credited with the term "semiotics" and made it a noun.

In later life, Mead was a mentor to many young anthropologists and sociologists, including Jean Houston, author Gail Sheehy, John Langston Gwaltney, Roger Sandall, filmmaker Timothy Asch, and anthropologist Susan C. Scrimshaw, who later received the 1985 Margaret Mead Award for her research on cultural factors affecting public health delivery.

In 1976, Mead was a key participant at UN Habitat I, the first UN forum on human settlements.

Mead died of pancreatic cancer on November 15, 1978, and is buried at Trinity Episcopal Church Cemetery, Buckingham, Pennsylvania.

Work

Coming of Age in Samoa (1928)

In the foreword to Coming of Age in Samoa, Mead's advisor, Franz Boas, wrote of its significance:

Courtesy, modesty, good manners, conformity to definite ethical standards are universal, but what constitutes courtesy, modesty, very good manners, and definite ethical standards is not universal.  It is instructive to know that standards differ in the most unexpected ways.

Mead's findings suggested that the community ignores both boys and girls until they are about 15 or 16. Before then, children have no social standing within the community. Mead also found that marriage is regarded as a social and economic arrangement in which wealth, rank, and job skills of the husband and wife are taken into consideration.

In 1970, National Educational Television produced a documentary in commemoration of the 40th anniversary Mead's first expedition to New Guinea. Through the eyes of Mead on her final visit to the village of Peri, the film records how the role of the anthropologist has changed in the forty years since 1928.

Controversy
After her death, Mead's Samoan research was criticized by the anthropologist Derek Freeman, who published a book arguing against many of Mead's conclusions in Coming of Age in Samoa.<ref>Derek Freeman (1983). Margaret Mead and Samoa. Cambridge, London: Harvard University Press. .</ref> Freeman argued that Mead had misunderstood Samoan culture when she argued that Samoan culture did not place many restrictions on youths' sexual explorations. Freeman argued instead that Samoan culture prized female chastity and virginity and that Mead had been misled by her female Samoan informants. Freeman found that the Samoan islanders whom Mead had depicted in such utopian terms were intensely competitive and had murder and rape rates higher than those in the United States. Furthermore, the men were intensely sexually jealous, which contrasted sharply with Mead’s depiction of 'free love" among the Samoans.

Freeman's book was controversial in its turn and was met with considerable backlash and harsh criticism from the anthropology community, but it was received enthusiastically by communities of scientists who believed that sexual mores were more or less universal across cultures. Later in 1983, a special session of Mead's supporters in the American Anthropological Association (to which Freeman was not invited) declared it to be "poorly written, unscientific, irresponsible and misleading." Some anthropologists who studied Samoan culture argued in favor of Freeman's findings and contradicted those of Mead, but others argued that Freeman's work did not invalidate Mead's work because Samoan culture had been changed by the integration of Christianity in the decades between Mead's and Freeman's fieldwork periods.

Mead was careful to shield the identity of all her subjects for confidentiality, but Freeman found and interviewed one of her original participants, and Freeman reported that she admitted to having willfully misled Mead. She said that she and her friends were having fun with Mead and telling her stories.

In 1996, the author Martin Orans examined Mead's notes preserved at the Library of Congress and credits her for leaving all of her recorded data available to the general public. Orans points out that Freeman's basic criticisms, that Mead was duped by ceremonial virgin Fa'apua'a Fa'amu, who later swore to Freeman that she had played a joke on Mead, were equivocal for several reasons. Mead was well aware of the forms and frequency of Samoan joking, she provided a careful account of the sexual restrictions on ceremonial virgins that corresponds to Fa'apua'a Fa'auma'a's account to Freeman, and Mead's notes make clear that she had reached her conclusions about Samoan sexuality before meeting Fa'apua'a Fa'amu. Orans points out that Mead's data support several different conclusions and that Mead's conclusions hinge on an interpretive, rather than positivist, approach to culture. Orans went on to point out concerning Mead's work elsewhere that her own notes do not support her published conclusive claims. Evaluating Mead's work in Samoa from a positivist stance, Orans's assessment of the controversy was that Mead did not formulate her research agenda in scientific terms and that "her work may properly be damned with the harshest scientific criticism of all, that it is 'not even wrong'."

On the whole, anthropologists have rejected the notion that Mead's conclusions rested on the validity of a single interview with a single person and find instead that Mead based her conclusions on the sum of her observations and interviews during her time in Samoa and that the status of the single interview did not falsify her work. Others such as Orans maintained that even though Freeman's critique was invalid, Mead's study was not sufficiently scientifically rigorous to support the conclusions she drew.

In 1999, Freeman published another book, The Fateful Hoaxing of Margaret Mead: A Historical Analysis of Her Samoan Research, including previously unavailable material. In his obituary in The New York Times, John Shaw stated that his thesis, though upsetting many, had by the time of his death generally gained widespread acceptance. Recent work has nonetheless challenged his critique. A frequent criticism of Freeman is that he regularly misrepresented Mead's research and views. In a 2009 evaluation of the debate, anthropologist Paul Shankman concluded:

There is now a large body of criticism of Freeman's work from a number of perspectives in which Mead, Samoa, and anthropology appear in a very different light than they do in Freeman's work. Indeed, the immense significance that Freeman gave his critique looks like 'much ado about nothing' to many of his critics.

While nurture-oriented anthropologists are more inclined to agree with Mead's conclusions, there are other non-anthropologists who take a nature-oriented approach following Freeman's lead, such as Harvard psychologist Steven Pinker, biologist Richard Dawkins, evolutionary psychologist David Buss, science writer Matt Ridley, classicist Mary Lefkowitz, and moral philosopher Peter Singer.

In her 2015 book Galileo's Middle Finger, Alice Dreger argues that Freeman's accusations were unfounded and misleading. A detailed review of the controversy by Paul Shankman, published by the University of Wisconsin Press in 2009, supports the contention that Mead's research was essentially correct and concludes that Freeman cherry-picked his data and misrepresented both Mead and Samoan culture.

A survey of 301 anthropology faculty in the United States in 2016 had two thirds agreeing with a statement that Mead "romanticizes the sexual freedom of Samoan adolescents" and half agreeing that it was ideologically motivated.

Mead's Sex and Temperament in Three Primitive Societies became influential within the feminist movement since it claimed that females are dominant in the Tchambuli (now spelled Chambri) Lake region of the Sepik basin of Papua New Guinea (in the western Pacific) without causing any special problems. The lack of male dominance may have been the result of the Australian administration's outlawing of warfare. According to contemporary research, males are dominant throughout Melanesia (although some believe that female witches have special powers). Others have argued that there is still much cultural variation throughout Melanesia, especially in the large island of New Guinea. Moreover, anthropologists often overlook the significance of networks of political influence among females. The formal male-dominated institutions typical of some areas of high population density were not, for example, present in the same way in Oksapmin, West Sepik Province, a more sparsely-populated area. Cultural patterns there were different from, say, Mount Hagen. They were closer to those described by Mead.

Mead stated that the Arapesh people, also in the Sepik, were pacifists, but she noted that they on occasion engage in warfare. Her observations about the sharing of garden plots among the Arapesh, the egalitarian emphasis in child rearing, and her documentation of predominantly peaceful relations among relatives are very different from the "big man" displays of dominance that were documented in more stratified New Guinea cultures, such as by Andrew Strathern. They are a different cultural pattern.

In brief, her comparative study revealed a full range of contrasting gender roles:
 "Among the Arapesh, both men and women were peaceful in temperament and neither men nor women made war.
 "Among the Mundugumor, the opposite was true: both men and women were warlike in temperament.
 "And the Tchambuli were different from both. The men 'primped' and spent their time decorating themselves while the women worked and were the practical ones—the opposite of how it seemed in early 20th century America."

Deborah Gewertz (1981) studied the Chambri (called Tchambuli by Mead) in 1974–1975 and found no evidence of such gender roles. Gewertz states that as far back in history as there is evidence (1850s), Chambri men dominated the women, controlled their produce, and made all important political decisions. In later years, there has been a diligent search for societies in which women dominate men or for signs of such past societies, but none has been found (Bamberger 1974). Jessie Bernard criticised Mead's interpretations of her findings and argued that Mead's descriptions were subjective. Bernard argues that Mead claimed the Mundugumor women were temperamentally identical to men, but her reports indicate that there were in fact sex differences; Mundugumor women hazed each other less than men hazed each other and made efforts to make themselves physically desirable to others, married women had fewer affairs than married men, women were not taught to use weapons, women were used less as hostages and Mundugumor men engaged in physical fights more often than women. In contrast, the Arapesh were also described as equal in temperament, but Bernard states that Mead's own writings indicate that men physically fought over women, yet women did not fight over men. The Arapesh also seemed to have some conception of sex differences in temperament, as they would sometimes describe a woman as acting like a particularly quarrelsome man. Bernard also questioned if the behaviour of men and women in those societies differed as much from Western behaviour as Mead claimed. Bernard argued that some of her descriptions could be equally descriptive of a Western context.

Despite its feminist roots, Mead's work on women and men was also criticized by Betty Friedan on the basis that it contributes to infantilizing women.

Other research areas
In 1926, there was much debate about race and intelligence. Mead felt the methodologies involved in the experimental psychology research supporting arguments of racial superiority in intelligence were substantially flawed. In "The Methodology of Racial Testing: Its Significance for Sociology," Mead proposes that there are three problems with testing for racial differences in intelligence. First, there are concerns with the ability to validly equate one's test score with what Mead refers to as racial admixture or how much Negro or Indian blood an individual possesses. She also considers whether that information is relevant when interpreting IQ scores. Mead remarks that a genealogical method could be considered valid if it could be "subjected to extensive verification." In addition, the experiment would need a steady control group to establish whether racial admixture was actually affecting intelligence scores. Next, Mead argues that it is difficult to measure the effect that social status has on the results of a person's intelligence test. She meant that environment (family structure, socioeconomic status, and exposure to language, etc.) has too much influence on an individual to attribute inferior scores solely to a physical characteristic such as race. Then, Mead adds that language barriers sometimes create the biggest problem of all. Similarly, Stephen J. Gould finds three main problems with intelligence testing in his 1981 book The Mismeasure of Man that relate to Mead's view of the problem of determining whether there are racial differences in intelligence.Gould, Stephen J. The Mismeasure of Man, New York City: W. W. Norton & Company, 1981.

In 1929, Mead and Fortune visited Manus, now the northernmost province of Papua New Guinea, and traveled there by boat from Rabaul. She amply describes her stay there in her autobiography, and it is mentioned in her 1984 biography by Jane Howard.  On Manus, she studied the Manus people of the south coast village of Peri. "Over the next five decades Mead would come back oftener to Peri than to any other field site of her career.'

Mead has been credited with persuading the American Jewish Committee to sponsor a project to study European Jewish villages, shtetls, in which a team of researchers would conduct mass interviews with Jewish immigrants living in New York City. The resulting book, widely cited for decades, allegedly created the Jewish mother stereotype, a mother intensely loving but controlling to the point of smothering and engendering guilt in her children through the suffering she professed to undertake for their sakes.

Mead worked for the RAND Corporation, a US Air Force military-funded private research organization, from 1948 to 1950 to study Russian culture and attitudes toward authority.

As an Anglican Christian, Mead played a considerable part in the drafting of the 1979 American Episcopal Book of Common Prayer.

Legacy
In 1976, Mead was inducted into the National Women's Hall of Fame.

On January 19, 1979, US President Jimmy Carter announced that he was awarding the Presidential Medal of Freedom posthumously to Mead. UN Ambassador Andrew Young presented the award to Mead's daughter at a special program honoring her contributions that was sponsored by the American Museum of Natural History, where she spent many years of her career. The citation read:

The US Postal Service issued a stamp of face value 32¢ on May 28, 1998 as part of the Celebrate the Century stamp sheet series.

The Margaret Mead Award is awarded in her honor jointly by the Society for Applied Anthropology and the American Anthropological Association, for significant works in communicating anthropology to the general public.

In addition, there are several schools named after Mead in the United States: a junior high school in Elk Grove Village, Illinois, an elementary school in Sammamish, Washington and another in Sheepshead Bay, Brooklyn, New York.

In 1979, the Supersisters trading card set was produced and distributed; one of the cards featured Mead's name and picture.

The 2014 novel Euphoria by Lily King is a fictionalized account of Mead's love/marital relationships with fellow anthropologists Reo Fortune and Gregory Bateson in New Guinea before World War II.

In the 1967 musical Hair, her name is given to a tranvestite "tourist" disturbing the show with the song "My Conviction."

Bibliography

Note: See also Margaret Mead: The Complete Bibliography 1925–1975, Joan Gordan, ed., The Hague: Mouton.

As a sole authorComing of Age in Samoa (1928)Growing Up in New Guinea (1930)The Changing Culture of an Indian Tribe (1932)Sex and Temperament in Three Primitive Societies (1935)And Keep Your Powder Dry: An Anthropologist Looks at America (1942)Male and Female (1949)New Lives for Old: Cultural Transformation in Manus, 1928–1953 (1956)People and Places (1959; a book for young readers)Continuities in Cultural Evolution (1964)Culture and Commitment (1970)The Mountain Arapesh: Stream of events in Alitoa (1971)Blackberry Winter: My Earlier Years (1972; autobiography)

As editor or coauthorBalinese Character: A Photographic Analysis, with Gregory Bateson, 1942, New York Academy of Sciences.
 Soviet Attitudes Toward Authority (1951)Cultural Patterns and Technical Change, editor (1953)Primitive Heritage: An Anthropological Anthology, edited with Nicholas Calas (1953)An Anthropologist at Work, editor (1959, reprinted 1966; a volume of Ruth Benedict's writings)The Study of Culture at a Distance, edited with Rhoda Metraux, 1953Themes in French Culture, with Rhoda Metraux, 1954The Wagon and the Star: A Study of American Community Initiative co-authored with Muriel Whitbeck Brown, 1966A Rap on Race, with James Baldwin, 1971A Way of Seeing, with Rhoda Metraux, 1975

See also

Tim Asch
Gregory Bateson
Ray Birdwhistell
Macy Conferences
Elsie Clews Parsons
Visual anthropology
Zora Neale Hurston
75½ Bedford St

References

Sources

Bateson, Mary Catherine. (1984) With a Daughter's Eye: A Memoir of Margaret Mead and Gregory Bateson, New York: William Morrow. 

Caffey, Margaret M., and Patricia A. Francis, eds. (2006). To Cherish the Life of the World:  Selected Letters of Margaret Mead.  New York: Basic Books.
Caton, Hiram, ed. (1990) The Samoa Reader: Anthropologists Take Stock, University Press of America. 

Foerstel, Leonora, and Angela Gilliam, eds. (1992). Confronting the Margaret Mead Legacy: Scholarship, Empire and the South Pacific. Philadelphia: Temple University Press.
Freeman, Derek. (1983) Margaret Mead and Samoa, Cambridge, MA: Harvard University Press. 
Freeman, Derek. (1999) The Fateful Hoaxing of Margaret Mead: A Historical Analysis of Her Samoan Research, Boulder, CO: Westview Press. 

Holmes, Lowell D. (1987). Quest for the Real Samoa: the Mead/Freeman Controversy and Beyond. South Hadley, MA: Bergin and Garvey.
Howard, Jane. (1984). Margaret Mead: A Life, New York: Simon and Schuster.
Keeley, Lawrence (1996). War Before Civilization: the Myth of the Peaceful Savage (Oxford University Press). 
Lapsley, Hilary. (1999). Margaret Mead and Ruth Benedict: The Kinship of Women. University of Massachusetts Press. 

Lutkehaus, Nancy C. (2008). Margaret Mead: The Making of an American Icon. Princeton: Princeton University Press.  

 Mandler, Peter (2013). Return from the Natives: How Margaret Mead Won the Second World War and Lost the Cold War. New Haven, CT: Yale University Press.

Mead, Margaret. 1977. The Future as Frame for the Present. Audio recording of a lecture delivered July 11, 1977.

Pinker, Steven A. (1997). How the Mind Works. 
Sandall, Roger. (2001) The Culture Cult: Designer Tribalism and Other Essays. 

Shore, Brad. (1982) Sala'ilua: A Samoan Mystery. New York: Columbia University Press.

Virginia, Mary E. (2003). Benedict, Ruth (1887–1948). DISCovering U.S. History'' online edition, Detroit: Gale.

External links

 Margaret Mead at Monoskop
 Online video: .  Documentary about the Mead-Freeman controversy, including an interview with one of Mead's original informants.
Creative Intelligence: Female – "The Silent Revolution: Creative Man In Contemporary Society" Talk at UC Berkeley, 1962 (online audio file)
The Institute for Intercultural Studies– ethnographic institute founded by Mead, with resources relating to Mead's work.
Library of Congress, Margaret Mead: Human Nature and the Power of Culture
American Museum of Natural History, Margaret Mead Film & Video Festival

"Margaret Mead, 1901–1978: A Public Face of Anthropology": brief biography, Voice of America.
Clifford Geertz, "Margaret Mead", Biographical Memoirs of the National Academy of Sciences (1989)
The Dell Paperback Collection at the Library of Congress has first edition paperbacks of Mead's works.

1901 births
1978 deaths
American anthropology writers
American women anthropologists
American curators
American women curators
American systems scientists
Psychological anthropologists
Visual anthropologists
Women systems scientists
Women science writers
Fellows of the American Academy of Arts and Sciences
Presidential Medal of Freedom recipients
Barnard College alumni
Cyberneticists
Women cyberneticists
Deaths from cancer in New York (state)
Deaths from pancreatic cancer
DePauw University alumni
Kalinga Prize recipients
People associated with the American Museum of Natural History
Presidents of the American Anthropological Association
Columbia University faculty
University of Rhode Island faculty
Writers from Philadelphia
Youth empowerment people
20th-century American non-fiction writers
20th-century American scientists
20th-century American women scientists
20th-century American women writers
Social Science Research Council
American women non-fiction writers
Members of the Society of Woman Geographers
20th-century American anthropologists
20th-century American Episcopalians
American women academics
Bateson family
Articles containing video clips
Presidents of the International Society for the Systems Sciences
Members of the American Philosophical Society